The 2020 G20 Riyadh summit was the fifteenth meeting of the Group of Twenty (G20). It was scheduled to take place in Riyadh, the capital city of Saudi Arabia, on 21–22 November 2020. However, due to the COVID-19 pandemic, it was held virtually.

Participating leaders

Invited guests

Presidency
The G20 Riyadh Summit was chaired by the Saudi King, Salman bin Abdulaziz.

The Kingdom of Saudi Arabia assumed the G20 Presidency in December 2019, leading up to the Leaders’ Summit to be held in Riyadh on 21–22 November 2020. The Kingdom would guide the work of the G20 under the theme of “Realizing Opportunities of the 21st Century for All” and would officially focus on three aims:

 Empowering People by creating the conditions in which all people – especially women and youth – can live, work and thrive.
 Safeguarding the Planet: by fostering collective efforts to protect our global commons.
 Shaping New Frontiers: by adopting long-term and bold strategies to share benefits of innovation and technological advancement.
Saudi Arabia released a 20 riyal commemorative banknote to mark the G20 presidency.

First Sherpa meeting
The meeting was chaired by H.E. Dr. Fahad Almubarak, the Saudi Sherpa, who elaborated: “The G20 has a responsibility to the world to overcome current and emerging issues, to tackle global challenges together, and to make the world a better place for all."

Sideline events
In the sideline of the summit, Saudi Arabia will be organizing preparatory ministerial meetings as well as other meetings of high governmental officials and representatives from the private sector and non-governmental organizations.

Emergency meeting
On 26 March 2020, the G20 members held an emergency summit via video conference, maintaining social distancing amid COVID-19, in order to plan a coordinated global response against the COVID-19 pandemic. Chaired by King Salman of Saudi Arabia, who presided the 2020 summit, the meeting aimed at finding ways to tackle the economic implications of the virus on global economy, with people losing their jobs and incomes due to lockdowns and curfews imposed globally.

Human rights organization Amnesty International expressed disappointment at the exclusion of human rights-compliant action plans in the emergency summit. A series of demands such as moving towards a zero-carbon economy, guaranteeing access of information to all, and fully integrated gender perspective plans, were made by Amnesty. In addition, the NGO also demanded the release of pre-trial detainees, where possible, and prisoners of conscience such as Saudi Arabia’s Raif Badawi, Loujain al-Hathloul, and Samar Badawi, to prevent the potential spread of coronavirus in prison populations owing to their low immunity.

Historical background
Saudi Arabia's first participation in the G20 meetings was in 2008 Washington summit. By then and as the world suffered from a global crisis, Saudi Arabia was the tenth largest sovereign wealth fund in the world and the second largest oil reserves. Initially, the Saudi entrance to the G20 was due to its economic importance as an effective pricing force in the energy market.

Controversies
On 7 October 2020, the European Parliament released a resolution denouncing the human rights violations of Saudi Arabia. The resolution passed by Member of the European Parliament (MEPs) published highlighting the Kingdom's brutal treatment of the Ethiopian migrants, who were abandoned by the Houthis in Yemen and later detained by Saudi authorities. The MEPs also criticized the country for keeping women's and other human rights defenders in detention, and urged the European Union members to downgrade their diplomatic and institutional representation at the Riyadh G20 Summit.

Under the Group of Twenty (G20) Riyadh summit, Saudi Arabia planned on hosting the B20 event, for which it was criticized by human rights groups and pro-democracy activists over the treatment of women in the country. Activists urged diplomats, politicians and blue chip companies like HSBC, Mastercard, and PepsiCo., to boycott the business event and said Saudi Arabia's real change-makers are behind bars, continuously facing abuse in prison cells, including electric shocks, flogging and sexual assault.

The Secretary of State for Foreign, Commonwealth and Development Affairs, Dominic Raab, received calls in November 2020 to boycott the G20 summit in Saudi Arabia because of the Kingdom's atrocious human rights record and recent attempts of driving the Bedouin tribe from their land to make way for its upcoming futuristic megacity project, Neom.

See also
 2019 G20 Osaka summit
 List of G20 summits
 List of G7 summits
 G20 Washington Summit 2008

References

External links
 Official website of the G20 

2020 conferences
2020 in international relations
2020 in Saudi Arabia
21st-century diplomatic conferences (Global)
2020 G20 summit
Diplomatic conferences in Saudi Arabia
Events affected by the COVID-19 pandemic
2020 Riyadh
Impact of the COVID-19 pandemic on politics
November 2020 events in Asia